The 1946 Michigan Tech Huskies football team was an American football team that represented Michigan College of Mining and Technology (later renamed Michigan Technological University) as an independent during the 1946 college football season. In their first and only year under head coach Rex Benoit, the Huskies compiled a 3–2 record and were outscored by a total of 54 to 49.

Schedule

References

Michigan Tech
Michigan Tech Huskies football
Michigan Tech Huskies football